Vindhya Pradesh was a former state of India. It occupied an area of 61,131.5 km2 (23,603 sq. miles). It was created in 1948 as Union of Baghelkhand and Bundelkhand States, shortly after Indian independence, from the territories of the princely states in the eastern portion of the former Central India Agency. It was named as Vindhya Pradesh on 25 January 1950 after the Vindhya Range, which runs through the centre of the province. The capital of the state was firstly Singrauli till 1953, secondly Rewa from 1953 onwards. It lays between Uttar Pradesh to the north and Madhya Pradesh to the south, and the enclave of Datia, which lay a short distance to the west, was surrounded by the state of Madhya Bharat.

Vindhya Pradesh was merged into Madhya Pradesh in 1956, following the States Reorganisation Act.

History
Vindhya Pradesh state was formed on 12 March 1948 and the newly formed state was inaugurated on 4 April 1948. Following its formation 36 princely states were merged to form Vindhya Pradesh state: 

 Rewa
 Panna
 Datia
 Orchha
 Ajaigarh
 Baoni
 Baraundha
 Bijawar
 Chhatarpur
 Charkhari
 Maihar
 Nagod
 Samthar
 Alipura
 Tiroha
 Banka-Pahari
 Beri
 Bhaisunda (Chaube Jagir)
 Bihat
 Bijna
 Dhurwai
 Garrauli
 Gaurihar
 Jaso
 Jigni
 Khaniadhana
 Kamta Rajaula (Chaube Jagir)
 Kothi
 Kirur (Kubje Jagir)
 Lugasi
 Naigawan Rebai
 Pahra (Chaube Jagir)
 Paldeo (Chaube Jagir)
 Sarila
 Sohawal
 Tori-Fatehpur (Hasht-Bhaiya Jagir)

On 25 January 1950, 11 erstwhile princely states, namely, Bihat, Banka Paharee, Baoni, Beri, Bijna, Charkhari, Jigni, Samthar, Sarila, Tori-Fatehpur and parts of Kirur Kubje were transferred to Uttar Pradesh and Madhya Bharat. Vindhya Pradesh, together with the states of Madhya Bharat and Bhopal State, was merged into Madhya Pradesh on 1 November 1956.

Divisions

After formation, the state was divided into two divisions, which were further divided into 8 districts.

Bundelkhand Division with its headquarters at Nowgaon comprised the following 4 districts:

 Panna district
 Chhatarpur district
 Tikamgarh district
 Datia district

Baghelkhand Division with its headquarters at Singrauli and then Rewa comprised the following 4 districts: 
 Rewa district
 Satna district
 Sidhi district
 Shahdol district
 Singrauli District, the largest district in the Baghelkhand Division

Politics
The nominal heads of the state were the Rajpramukh from 1948–49, the Chief Commissioner from March 1949–1952 and the Lieutenant Governor from March 1952–October 1956. The state had a Vidhan Sabha comprising 60 members elected from 48 constituencies (36 single-member and 12 double-member). There were 4 Lok Sabha constituencies in the state (2 single-member and 2 double-member).

Following the formation of the state in 1948, Rameshwar Prasad Singh, the last ruler of Singrauli became the Rajpramukh but he shortly died after so Martand Singh, the last ruler of the princely state of Rewa became the Rajpramukh and Yadvendra Singh, the last ruler of the princely state of Panna became the Uparajpramukh. Initially Awadhesh Pratap Singh became the Chief Minister of the Vindhya Pradesh.

After he resigned on 14 April 1949, N.B. Bonerji, took over on 15 April 1949 as Chief Commissioner. He was succeeded by S. N. Mehta.

In the first general election in 1951, the Indian National Congress won 40 seats and the Socialist Party won 11 seats. S.N.Shukla of Indian National Congress became the Chief Minister of the state on 13 March 1952, Shivanand became the Speaker and Ram Kishore Shukla of Socialist Party the leader of the opposition of the house. The house dissolved on 31 October 1956.

Nowadays the voices of separation of Vindhya Pradesh from Madhya Pradesh, are stoked by Maihar MLA Narayan Tripathi and social worker, Kuldeep Agnihotri, who is associated with the Agni Shakti Education Foundation, in Rewa, Madhya Pradesh.

See also
List of proposed states and territories of India

References

Regions of India
Historical Indian regions
History of Madhya Pradesh (1947–present)
Proposed states and union territories of India
1948 establishments in India
1956 disestablishments in India
Former states and territories of India